Pavel Maratovich Orlov (born 8 December 1992) is a Russian former professional football player.

Club career
He made his Russian Football National League debut for FC Tambov on 27 July 2016 in a game against FC Mordovia Saransk.

External links
 
 
 Career summary by sportbox.ru

1992 births
People from Kamyshin
Living people
Russian footballers
Association football defenders
Russian expatriate footballers
Expatriate footballers in Latvia
FC Energiya Volzhsky players
FC Jūrmala players
FC Solyaris Moscow players
FC Mordovia Saransk players
FC Tambov players
FC Zenit-Izhevsk players
Latvian Higher League players
FC Nosta Novotroitsk players
Sportspeople from Volgograd Oblast